Chestline is an unincorporated community in Beverly and McKee Township Townships, Adams County, Illinois, United States. Chestline is southeast of Liberty.

A post office called Chestline was established in 1882, and remained in operation until 1906. According to tradition, a grove of chestnut trees near the original town site accounts for the name.

References

Unincorporated communities in Adams County, Illinois
Unincorporated communities in Illinois